Rinchenpong is a town in West Sikkim, India. It is situated in West Sikkim, about 123 km west of Gangtok, 47 km due south of Gyalshing, close to the village of Kaluk.  It sits at an altitude of 5576 feet (1,700m). It is known for the Reesum Monastery and trekking routes.

Near the town is the site of a historical battle between the forces of the then Chogyal (King) of Sikkim and the invading British forces. The Lepcha tribesmen used a concoction of unidentified herbs to poison the only water source, a lake (local term : pokhri). As a result, more than half of the British forces were killed, which stopped the British invasion and resulted in an accord. The lake remains poisoned even to this day and is known as bikh-pokhri locally (poisoned lake).

The region's local language is Nepali, Lepcha, Bhutia, Hindi and English. The area's height is 5576 ft., and postcode is 737111.

Tourism 
Richenpong is a well-known tourist spot in West Sikkim, because of the view of the mountain ranges seen from here. It is also a place famous for 2 of the oldest monasteries in Sikkim, Reesum Monastery and Rinchenpong Monastery. Both were built around 17th to 18th century. Rinchenpong Monastery is the 3rd oldest monastery in Sikkim, starting with around 98 lamas.[2] The monastery houses a rare Ati Buddha (Adi-Buddha) statue in the Yab-Yum position. Ati Buddha, also termed as The Primordial Buddha is said to be the true Buddha, symbolically represented as a naked Buddha in blue. In the Yab-Yum position, the Buddha is shown meditating while embracing a woman. In Buddhism it signifies the power of union of the male and female.[3]

It is even said that the 1913 Nobel laureate Rabindranath Tagore once visited this place and wrote a poem for his book Gitanjali, titled Chitto Jetha Bhayshunyo, later translated to English by him titled Where The Mind Is Without Fear. There is a viewpoint above Rinchen Chholing Monastery, named Rabindra Smriti Van honoured in the name of him. This viewpoint is filled with Rhododendron and some other seasonal flowers.

The tourism scene is active here since 2005 to 2006. The two of the oldest hotels here are Hotel Norlha and Hotel Rinchenpong Nest. It is a silent scenic place for everyone to quit from there busy life and stay for a couple of days for the refreshment. One can see the majestic view of Mount Kangchenjunga, Kabru, Mount Pandim and Kumbhakarna Mountain from here.

External links
Travel article on Rinchenpong by Rangan Datta

Hiking trails in India
Cities and towns in Gyalshing district